Boselli is an Italian surname. Variations include Bosio and Bossi, the former being among the original derivations of both names.  Also, Bossy and Bossie are two etymologically related forms found in French-speaking regions as well as in the United States.
Notable people with the surname include:

Antonio Boselli (16th century), Italian painter
Élisabeth Boselli (1914-2005), French military and civilian pilot
Enrico Boselli (born 1957), Italian politician and former leader of the Italian Democratic Socialists
Felice Boselli (1650–1732), Italian Baroque painter
Giacomo Boselli (c. 1744 – 1808), Italian sculptor and painter
Juan Boselli (born 1994), Uruguayan footballer 
Juan Manuel Boselli (born 1999), Uruguayan footballer
Mauro Boselli (writer) (born 1953), Italian comic book writer and editor
Mauro Boselli (born 1985), Argentine footballer
Milvia Boselli (born 1943), former Italian politician
Orfeo Boselli (1597–1667), Italian sculptor
Paolo Boselli (1838–1932), Italian politician and Prime Minister during World War I
Pietro Boselli (born 1988), Italian engineer, former mathematics lecturer at University College London and model
Tony Boselli (born 1972), American football player

See also 

 Bossio

Italian-language surnames
Surnames of Italian origin